Spit! was the name of a British adult comic that was published from 1994.

It was one of many such comics similar to Viz, and was also considerably cruder and of lower production quality than its inspiration, many strips ending with sexual humour. As well as comic strips, it also included photo strips, joke articles, celebrity references, and adverts for phone lines and mail order products. One of its contributing writer/cartoonists was Allin Kempthorne who has since gone on to become a television and film actor and writer.

Another contributing writer/cartoonist was Gary Bell, who has since gone on to become an addiction treatment activist and blogger , appearing in the 2014 documentary One Little Pill to talk about his experience of using The Sinclair Method to recover from a decades long battle with alcoholism.

References

Adult humour titles
Defunct British comics